SMT may refer to:

Businesses and organisations

Based in Scotland
 Scottish Mortgage Investment Trust (LSE stock symbol: SMT)
 Scottish Motor Traction, a defunct bus operator

Based in the United States
 SMT (media company), a provider of live sports scoring
 Seismic Micro-Technology, a seismology software developer
 Society for Music Theory, a learned society

Rail transport
 St Margarets railway station (Hertfordshire), England
 Semarang Tawang railway station, Indonesia
 Shanghai maglev train, a line in China

Science and technology
 Satisfiability modulo theories, in computer science and logic
 Simultaneous multithreading, in computing
 Statistical machine translation, in computational linguistics
 Sulfamethazine, an antibiotic drug
 Surface-mount technology, in electronics
 Heinrich Hertz Submillimeter Telescope, Arizona, United States

Other uses
 Senior management team, at schools in the UK
 Shin Megami Tensei, a video game series
 Shrimati (Smt.), an Indian feminine honorific
 Simte language, spoken in India (ISO 639-3 code)